Stewart Heights is a small, partly snow-covered heights which rise to 2,760 m, situated just south of Arrowhead Range and between the upper forks of Cosmonaut Glacier in the Southern Cross Mountains, Victoria Land. Named by the southern party of New Zealand Geological Survey Antarctic Expedition (NZGSAE), 1966–67, for Ian Stewart, field assistant with this party.

Mountains of Victoria Land
Borchgrevink Coast